Manuel Bartlett Bautista (December 23, 1894 in Tenosique, Tabasco – April 24, 1963 in Mexico City) was a Mexican journalist, lawyer, judge, and politician who served as Governor of the State of Tabasco for two years, before being pressured to resign.

Biography

Manuel Bartlett Bautista  was born in Tenosique to Gabriel Bartlett Cámara, a businessman of partial Cornish descent, and Teodora Bautista Pérez. He completed his primary studies in Tenosique and his secondary studies there and at the Mexican Methodist Institute of Puebla. From 1909 to 1915 he lived in Villahermosa, then known as San Juan Bautista de la Villa Hermosa, studying at the Instituto Juárez while also agitating through revolutionary circles. In 1913 Bartlett helped found and became President of the Juárez Institute's Free Student Association, but ended up being expelled from the school after leading a protest against Huerta's assassination of President Madero. While at the Universidad Nacional Autónoma de México he worked as editor of the student newspaper El Estudiante, graduating with a degree in law in 1920.

Bartlett returned to Villahermosa that same year and taught for a brief time at his old school, the Instituto Juárez. He also served as syndic in the Ayuntamiento del Centro (City Council) and President of the Committee of Public Health. From 1921-22 he served as a deputy to the Congress of the State of Tabasco. From 1920 to 1929 he held various legal and governmental positions, including consulting lawyer to the City Council of Mexico City (1920); public defender to the military (1922); consulting lawyer to the Secretariat of Finance and Public Credit (1924–28); and chief of the legal department of the same (1929). After a decade working in different district-judicial capacities Bartlett was made a Justice of the Mexican Supreme Court, position which he would hold from 1941 to 1951.

In 1953, after three previously unsuccessful attempts, Bartlett obtained the PRI's nomination for the governorship of Tabasco, a decision which, owing to the party's virtual monopoly on power, all but assured him the office. However, as a result of intra-party struggles combined with civil unrest in the state, Bartlett fell out of favor with the Adolfo Ruiz Cortines administration and was pressured to leave the post before the conclusion of his term. On March 22, 1955, Bartlett asked for and was granted a leave of absence by the State Congress, effectively ending his governorship.

Bartlett was married to Isabel Díaz Castilla, niece of famed poet and insurgent Salvador Díaz Mirón. His son Manuel Bartlett Díaz is a high PRI official and former governor of Puebla. Manuel Bartlett Bautista died on April 24, 1963 and is buried in Mexico City.

Published works
(list not comprehensive)

La defensa como procuración. 1920
El pocho, cojoes, tigres y pochoveras: interesantes y curiosas costumbres tradicionales de Tenosique, Tab. 1926
La cuestión electoral tabasqueña (1923-1926). 1954

Bibliography
(English) Camp, Roderic Ai, Mexican political biographies, 1935-1993. The Hague: Mouton, 1993.
(Spanish) Peralta Burelo, Francisco, Gobernadores de Tabasco separados del cargo, 1935-1987. Villahermosa, Tab.: Universidad Juárez Autónoma de Tabasco, 1988.

External links
El Ministro Manuel Bartlett Bautista 
Ex-gobernadores de Tabasco 

1894 births
1963 deaths
Ethnographers
Governors of Tabasco
Institutional Revolutionary Party politicians
Mexican educators
20th-century Mexican journalists
Male journalists
Mexican people of Cornish descent
Mexican judges
20th-century Mexican lawyers
Mexican legal writers
Supreme Court of Justice of the Nation justices
20th-century Mexican writers
20th-century Mexican male writers
National Autonomous University of Mexico alumni
Politicians from Tabasco
Members of the Congress of Tabasco
People from Tenosique
20th-century Mexican politicians